Gandghar Urdu: گندگر is series of mountains in Pakistan located east of the Indus River. The city of Haripur is situated at the front of these mountains; it borders Tarbela Dam to the south and the Hasan Abdal to the north. There are several tribes living in the Gandghar mountains, such as the Mashwani at the top of the hill in a village called Sirikot.

Gandhar is famous for the tales of fictional character of Raja Risalu (2nd century AD). Some of these tales are also reported by British Army officer Major Abbott (famous for Abbottabad) who reported that he has listened such stories from the locals during his stay in the area in the first thirty years of the 20th century.

Famous book Tuzke Jahngiri, travelogues of Mughal emperor Jahngir,  also mentions some of these tales associated with the Gandghar mountains.

One such tale is that RAJA RISALU used to stay during hunting expeditions in one of the caves of Sirban Mountain in Abottabad,   One day the Raja was informed by his parrot that his wife is in secret relation with another Demon (Dev) and they secretly meet in Gandghar mountains. Upon this Raja Rasalu rushed to the mountains where he found his wife and the Demon together.

The Demon ,afraid of the Raja's wrath, ran away from the occasion and found refuge in one of the caves of the Gandghar. The Raja chased the Demon and closed the opening of the cave with a huge rock.

Folk stories tell us  that the Demon jailed inside these mountains cries once in a year or two and the entire mountain range echoes with his cries.

References

Mountain ranges of Khyber Pakhtunkhwa